Felix Dreyschock (27 December 1860 in Leipzig – 1 August 1906 in Berlin) was a German pianist, nephew of Alexander Dreyschock. He was a pupil of Friedrich Kiel, Wilhelm Taubert and Heinrich Ehrlich in Berlin, where he in 1883 began to give concerts. In Stockholm he performed successfully in 1886 and 1889, both as a virtuoso and composer. He wrote major and minor works for piano, violin, vocals, orchestra, etc.

References

External links
 

19th-century classical composers
1860 births
1906 deaths
German classical pianists
Male classical pianists
German classical composers
Musicians from Leipzig
German male classical composers
19th-century classical pianists
19th-century German composers
German pianists
German male pianists
19th-century German male musicians